Gagyvendégi is a village in Borsod-Abaúj-Zemplén County in northeastern Hungary. , it had a population of 198. But in 2009, it was 188.

References

Populated places in Borsod-Abaúj-Zemplén County